Don is a town in Benin, Africa. Nearest large airports are 
Cotonou Cadjehoun in Cotonou and Lomé-Tokoin in Lomé, Togo.

Populated places in Benin